Philip Downing (September 3, 1871 – January 17, 1961)  was a member of the Wisconsin State Senate.

Biography
Downing was born on September 3, 1871 in Fenaghvale, Ontario, Canada and was a schoolteacher in Amberg, Wisconsin for ten years and then became postmaster. He later moved to Madison, Wisconsin. .

Career
Downing was elected to the Senate in 1940 and was re-elected in 1944, 1948 and 1952. He was a Republican.

References

See also
The Political Graveyard

People from the United Counties of Prescott and Russell
Canadian emigrants to the United States
Politicians from Madison, Wisconsin
Republican Party Wisconsin state senators
1871 births
1961 deaths
People from Marinette County, Wisconsin